Jitin Bahl (born 16 October 1975) is a former English first-class cricketer.

While studying at university, Bahl made a single appearance in first-class cricket for the British Universities cricket team against the touring Indians at Fenner's in 1996. In that same season he appeared in five List A one-day matches for the British Universities team in the Benson & Hedges Cup.

References

External links

1975 births
Living people
People from Hammersmith
English cricketers
Cricketers from Greater London
British Asian cricketers
British sportspeople of Indian descent
British Universities cricketers